Madara Chennaiah was an 11th-century Kannada vachana poet and saint who was a cobbler by profession. He is widely regarded as the first Vachanakara in India who lived in the reign of Western Chalukyas.

Further reading 
 Satyanarayana, K & Tharu, Susie (2011) No Alphabet in Sight: New Dalit Writing from South Asia, Dossier 1: Tamil and Malayalam, New Delhi: Penguin Books.
 Satyanarayana, K & Tharu, Susie (2013) From those Stubs Steel Nibs are Sprouting: New Dalit Writing from South Asia, Dossier 2: Kannada and Telugu, New Delhi: HarperCollins India.

Dalit writers
Indian male poets
Dalit Hindu saints
Kannada-language writers
11th-century Indian poets
Western Chalukya Empire
Dalit saints